Wiesław Chmielewski (born 14 February 1957) is a Polish modern pentathlete. He competed at the 1988 Summer Olympics.

References

External links
 

1957 births
Living people
Polish male modern pentathletes
Olympic modern pentathletes of Poland
Modern pentathletes at the 1988 Summer Olympics
People from Kamień County
Sportspeople from West Pomeranian Voivodeship